William George Archer, OBE (1907-1979) was a British civil servant and art historian, and later museum curator.

Career 

Archer was born on 1 February 1907, and studied first history at Emmanuel College, Cambridge, and then Hindi, Indian history and law at the School of Oriental Studies in London. He subsequently served in the Indian Civil Service, in Bihar, from 1931 until around 1947, when India gained independence. His roles included District Magistrate and Superintendent of the Census.He ordered to shoot 7 unarmed students who were trying to put the Indian flag on Patna secretariat during Quit India movement. He was also Additional Deputy Commissioner in the Naga Hills from 1946 to 1948. While in India, he developed a love and knowledge of Indian culture, including poetry and art, and of the Santal people. In the summer of 1934, while home from India on sick leave, he married the sister of one of his friends, Mildred Agnes Bell, who returned to India with him (she later worked as curator of prints and drawings at the India Office). The couple, who had two children while in India, shared socialist politics and a belief that India should be granted independence.

After the family's return to England, they lived on Provost Road, north of London's Primrose Hill, and Archer served as Keeper of the Indian Section, at the Victoria and Albert Museum from 1949-1959, and afterwards Keeper Emeritus.

In the 1950s and 60s, he presented arts programmes on BBC Television, as part of the series Monitor. He was a champion of the Indian artist Avinash Chandra.

Recognition and legacy 

Archer was appointed an Officer of the Order of the British Empire (OBE) in the 1948 New Year Honours, and was awarded honorary doctorates by Panjab University in 1968 and Guru Nanak Dev University in 1976. In 1978, he received the Royal Asiatic Society of Great Britain and Ireland's Burton Memorial Medal.

He died on 6 March 1979.

His papers, together with those of his wife, are held by the British Library.

Works

Books

Papers 

 Archer, Mildred & W.G. Archer (1955) Natural history paintings. In Indian painting for the British 1770–1880, pp. 91–98. Oxford, Oxford University Press.

References 

1907 births
1979 deaths
Indian Civil Service (British India) officers
People associated with the Victoria and Albert Museum
British art critics
BBC television presenters
Officers of the Order of the British Empire
Alumni of Emmanuel College, Cambridge
Alumni of SOAS University of London
British art historians
British curators
People from the London Borough of Camden